Nicola Susan Clayton PhD, FRS, FSB, FAPS, C (born 22 November 1962) is a British psychologist. She is Professor of Comparative Cognition at the University of Cambridge, Scientist in Residence at Rambert Dance Company, co-founder of 'The Captured Thought', a Fellow of Clare College, Cambridge, where she is Director of Studies in Psychology, and a Fellow of the Royal Society since 2010. Clayton was made Honorary Director of Studies and advisor to the 'China UK Development Centre'(CUDC) in 2018. She has been awarded professorships by Nanjing University, Institute of Technology, China (2018), Beijing University of Language and Culture, China (2019), and Hangzhou Diangi University, China (2019). Clayton was made Director of the Cambridge Centre for the Integration of Science, Technology and Culture (CCISTC) in 2020.

Early life and education 
Clayton graduated with a Bachelor of Arts with Honours in zoology from the University of Oxford in 1984, before gaining a PhD from the University of St Andrews in 1987.

Career

University of Cambridge 
Clayton has made major contributions in the study of animal cognition as well as cognitive development in human children, with significant impact in the neurobiology of memory and overall cognitive development.[5] Her expertise in the study of comparative cognition integrates a knowledge of both biology and psychology in providing new methods of thinking about the evolution and development of intelligence in non-verbal animals and pre-verbal children. Clayton studies cognition not only in humans but also in members of the crow family (including jackdaws, rooks and jays). This work has challenged many assumptions that only humans can reminisce about the past and plan for the future, and that only humans can understand other times as well as other minds. Her work has also led to a re-evaluation of the cognitive capacities of animals, specifically birds, and resulted in a theory that intelligence evolved independently in at least two groups, the apes and the crows, and most recently cephalopods. This has also had scientific impact in changing the Animal Welfare (Sentience) Bill.

Rambert Dance Company 
Since 2009, Clayton has worked with the Rambert Dance Company as science collaborator, then scientific adviser, and now scientist-in-residence. As a dancer, specializing in tango and salsa, she draws evidence from both the arts and science in her collaborations. In 2009, Clayton experienced her first collaboration by becoming involved in a dance piece called The Comedy of Change, which was inspired by Charles Darwin's ideas of natural and sexual selection. She met the choreographer and Artistic Director of Rambert Dance Company, Mark Baldwin, and gave input about science that could inform the piece. Other choreographic works inspired by science Clayton has collaborated with Baldwin on include Seven For a Secret, Never To Be Told, What Wild Ecstasy, The Strange Charm of Mother Nature, The Creation, Perpetual Movement and Bold.

The piece Seven For a Secret, Never To Be Told was based on the psychology of children, an area of Clayton's research. Clayton singled out themes related to the behavioural development of children, such as the importance of play, which helped to inspire the choreography. This piece was another collaboration between Clayton and Baldwin; the title inspired by a line from the nursery rhyme One for Sorrow, which was based on a superstition associating the number of magpies one sees to prediction of one's future.

The Captured Thought 

Another of Clayton's collaborations is with the artist and author Clive Wilkins, who has been Artist in Resident in the psychology department at the University of Cambridge since 2012, a position created especially for Wilkins. Their collaboration arose out of a mutual interest in mental time travel and resulted in Clayton and Wilkins co-founding "The Captured Thought~ an arts/science collaboration." Their work and lectures explore the subjective experience of thinking, by drawing evidence from both science and the arts to examine perception and the nature of mental time travel, as well as the mechanisms we use to think about the future and reminisce about the past. The goal of this project is to illuminate ideas concerning memories and question the power of analysis. Important aspects of The Captured Thought's work have been highlighted in articles in 'The Guardian' newspaper in 2019  and in 'Die Zeit' magazine in 2020. The Captured Thought were invited speakers at The University of Vienna's CogSciHub inauguration 2019 and India's National Brain Research Centre 16th Foundation Day. Clayton and Wilkins continue to present their work in lectures to universities and conferences across the globe~ including UK, Europe, USA, Asia, China and Australasia.Their work  together featured in the New Scientist Special Christmas and New Year issue 2022.

Published works 
 1998: Episodic-like memory during cache recovery by scrub jays
 2001: Effects of experience and social context on prospective caching strategies in scrub jays
 2004: The mentality of crows. Convergent evolution of intelligence in corvids and apes
 2006: Food-caching western scrubjays keep track of who was watching when
 2007: Planning for the future by Western Scrub-Jays
 2009: Western scrub-jays conceal auditory information when competitors can hear but cannot see
 2009: Episodic future thinking in 3- to 5- year-old-children: The ability to think of what will be needed from a different point of view
 2009: Chimpanzees solve the trap problem when the confound of tool-use is removed
 2012: Eurasian jays (Garrulus glandarius) overcome their current desires to anticipate two distinct future needs and plan for them appropriately
 2013: Careful cachers and prying pilferers: Eurasian jays (Garrulus glandarius) limit auditory information available to competitors
 2013: Evidence suggesting that desire-state attribution may govern food sharing in Eurasian jays
 2014: EPS Mid Career Award Lecture. Ways of Thinking: From Crows to Children and Back Again
 2014: Of babies and birds: complex tool behaviours are not sufficient for the evolution of the ability to create a novel causal intervention
 2014: Pilfering Eurasian jays use visual and acoustic information to locate caches
 2014: The Evolution of Self Control
 2015: Thinking ahead about where something is needed: New insights about episodic foresight in preschoolers
 2019: Tricks of the Mind. Experiencing the Impossible Current Biology. Book review 
 2019: Mind Tricks. Magic and mysticism reveal cognitive shortcuts with implications beyond entertainment
 2019:  Reflections on the Spoon Test. Neuropsychologia 
 2020:  An unexpected audience. Science 
 2021:  Exploring the perceptual inabilities of Eurasian jays (Garrulus glandarius) using magic effects. PNAS
 2021: Schnell, A.K., Clayton, N.S., Hanlon, R.T. & Jozet-Alves, C.. Episodic-like memory is preserved with age in cuttlefish. Proceedings of the Royal Society, 288, 20211052
 2021: Schnell, A. K., Loconsole, M., Garcia-Pelegrin, E., Wilkins, C. & Clayton, N. S.. Jays are sensitive to cognitive illusions. Royal Society Open Science, 8, 202358
 2021: Garcia-Pelegrin, E., Wilkins, C. & Clayton, N. S.. The ape that lived to tell the tale. The evolution of the art of storytelling and its relationship to Mental Time Travel and Theory of Mind. Frontiers in Psychology 12, 755-783
 2022: Garcia-Pelegrin, E., Schnell, A. K., Wilkins, C. & Clayton, N. S.. Could it be Protomagic? Deceptive tactics in non-human animals resemble magician’s misdirection. Psychology of Consciousness: Theory, Research and Practice, in press
 2022: Garcia-Pelegrin, E., Wilkins, C. & Clayton, N. S.. Are magicians specialists at identifying deceptive motion? The role of expertise in being fooled by sleight of hand.  Scientific Reports, in press

Awards 
 1997: Best Teachers in America Award
 1999: American Psychological Association's Frank Beach Award
 2003: Klaus Immelmann Award in Animal Behavior
 2010: Jean-Marie Delwart Award in Comparative and Evolutionary Neuroscience, Belgium Academy of Sciences
 2010: Elected Fellow of the Royal Society
 2012: Experimental Psychology Society Mid-Career Award
 2013: Fellow of the American Ornithological Society
 2019: President of the British Science Association Psychology Section
 2021: ASAB Tinbergen Lecturer award 
 2022: Association for the Study of Animal Behaviour (ASAB) Medal

References

External links 

Nicola Clayton profile at University of Cambridge Department of Psychology
The Captured Thought Blog

1962 births
Living people
Alumni of Pembroke College, Oxford
Alumni of the University of St Andrews
British neuroscientists
British women neuroscientists
British psychologists
British zoologists
British women scientists
Female Fellows of the Royal Society
Fellows of the Royal Society
Fellows of Clare College, Cambridge